The Toropets–Kholm offensive was a military operation conducted south of Lake Ilmen by the Red Army during World War II, from 9 January–6 February 1942. The operation contributed to the formation of the Kholm Pocket and the encirclement of the Wehrmacht's II Army Corps in the Demyansk Pocket.

Background
Following the successful Moscow counter-offensive of December 1941, the Stavka of the Red Army decided to conduct a broad-front offensive with the aim of destroying the invading German forces in the Soviet Union. The Wehrmacht did not expect the Red Army to be capable of such a wide-ranging offensive, and therefore was caught off guard by attacks in areas that it supposed to be quiet, such as the region south of Lake Ilmen.

Objective
The Soviet North-Western Front—under General Pavel Kurochkin—was given two tasks to be executed from its position south of Lake Ilmen. The first was a western thrust through Staraya Russa, to split German 18th Army and 16th Army, and support the effort of Volkhov Front and Leningrad Front in breaking the siege of Leningrad. The second was a south-western thrust toward Vitebsk. This attack was to be conducted by three armies, 33rd, 3rd and 4th Shock, the latter two having just recently been renamed. Its ultimate aim was to become the northern pincer of a deep envelopment of German Army Group Center.

Battle
The initial penetration of the 3rd and 4th Shock Armies was very successful. German forces in the sector were overrun with heavy losses. The failure to predict this attack—coupled with multiple demands on the German reserves—gave the Soviet Front command an opening which it exploited to the utmost, driving deep into the German rear. While the Soviet forces had few supplies at the start of the offensive, they could keep going through the capture of significant amounts of German supply stores at Toropets.

The tank support for such an operation was very weak on the Soviet side, especially compared to the requirements of the doctrine of Deep operations, and the practice later in the war, showing the dearth of resources in the Soviet arsenal at this low point of Soviet fortunes in the war. Yeremenko's 4th Shock Army had only two tank battalions, the 171st Tank Battalion with 12 Lend-Lease Matilda IIs, nine Valentines, and 10 T-60s, and the 141st Tank Battalion had four KV-1s, six T-34s, and 20 T-60s.

The drive of the Soviet forces was so strong that the defending German formation—123rd Infantry Division, which was covering a line of — had its forward two regiments overrun. The regiments were so thinly spread in their strongpoints that they could not cover each other, allowing the Soviet assault forces to simply walk through between them. The strongpoints were later reduced, with significant casualties for the Germans. A German reserve formation— the 81st Infantry Division— was brought in by rail during the last days of December. Its first regiment—the 189th Infantry under Colonel Hohmeyer together with the 2nd Battalion of Artillery Regiment 181 and the 3rd Company of the Engineer Battalion 181— was immediately ordered to detrain at Toropets and Andreapol. From there, it advanced to Okhvat where it was encircled and completely destroyed on 14 January. 1,100 dead were later found in a forest near Okhvat, including the regimental commander who was posthumously promoted to Major General. A total of 40 survivors from the artillery battalion made it back to the German lines. The move into action and collapse was so swift that the regiment was not even identified on German situation maps.

Aftermath
The Soviet aim of encircling Army Group Center was not achieved, but the attack by the two Shock Armies created a deep bend in the German frontline that was to become a major concern for the German army group commands during 1942, until the Rzhev Salient, of which this bend formed the northern border, was evacuated in March 1943.

The Soviet attack also created the Kholm Pocket, and the southern shoulder of the Demyansk Pocket.

Order of battle

Soviet
North-Western Front (elements with a strength of 122,100) (Pavel Kurochkin)
3rd Shock Army (Maksim Purkayev)
23rd Rifle Division
33rd Rifle Division
257th Rifle Division
20th, 27th, 31st, 42nd, 45th, 54th Rifle Brigades
63rd, 65th, 67th, 78th, 79th, 80th Ski Battalions
170th Tank Battalion
4th Shock Army (Andrey Yeryomenko)
249th Rifle Division
332nd Rifle Division
334th Rifle Division
358th Rifle Division
360th Rifle Division
21st Rifle Brigade
62nd, 64th Ski Battalions
141st, 171st Tank Battalions

German
Army Group North (elements of with unknown strength)
16th Army (Ernst Busch)
II. Army Corps (Walter von Brockdorff-Ahlefeldt)
123rd Infantry Division
416th Infantry Regiment
418th Infantry Regiment
81st Infantry Division
189th Infantry Regiment
SS Cavalry Brigade

References

Bibliography
Haupt, W. 'Army Group North'
MGFA (ed.) 'Generalfeldmarshall Ritter von Leeb'.
Vilinov, M.A. 'Features of the Toropets-Kholm Operation' VIZH 1988 Issue 1, English translation
Ziemke, E.F. 'Moscow to Stalingrad'
Info on the Kholm part of the Operation
Map of 3rd Shock Army Operations during the operation Jan 9-21 1942
Map of 4th Shock Army Operations during the operation Jan 9-21 1942
Map of 4th Shock Army Operations during the operation Jan 23-31 1942
Glantz, David M. & House, Jonathan (1995), When Titans Clashed: How the Red Army Stopped Hitler, Lawrence, Kansas: University Press of Kansas, .

1942 in the Soviet Union
Battles and operations of the Soviet–German War
Strategic operations of the Red Army in World War II
Military operations of World War II involving Germany
Conflicts in 1942
January 1942 events
February 1942 events